In the Cloud is a 2018 American sci-fi thriller film directed by Robert Scott Wildes and written by Vanya Asher, starring Justin Chatwin, Adetomiwa Edun, Nora Arnezeder and Gabriel Byrne. The film is an original production by Crackle.

Cast 
 Justin Chatwin as Halid 'Hale' Begovic
 Adetomiwa Edun as Theo Jones
 Nora Arnezeder as Suzanna (Z)
 Laura Fraser as Mary Klaxon
 Gabriel Byrne as Doc Wolff
 Charlie Carver as Jude
 Max Carver as Caden
 Daniel Portman as Max Kavinsky
 Ali Cook as Paul Avalon
 Sean Power as Robert
 Emmett J. Scanlan as Alfie
 Rosie Cavaliero as Sandra Bullington
 Aleksander Mikic as Soldier / Tata
 Sam Attwater as Rupert
 Maya Barcot as Mama

Production

Casting
On September 20, 2017, the film's cast was announced which included Nora Arnezeder, Gabriel Byrne, Justin Chatwin, Tomiwa Edun, and Laura Fraser.

Filming
The film was shot in Manchester. Principal photography began on August 22, 2017, and ended on September 17.

Release
The film premiered on Crackle on February 8, 2018.

Reception
David Bianculli, writing for TV Worth Watching, said, "It plays as derivatively as it sounds, but there is one reason, behind Byrne, to watch: One of his co-stars is Laura Fraser, who played Lydia the Stevia lover on Breaking Bad."

References

External links

 

2018 films
American science fiction thriller films
2010s science fiction thriller films
2010s English-language films
2010s American films